Supporting Characters is a film directed by Daniel Schechter. It was written by Schechter and Tarik Lowe. It had its world premiere at the Tribeca Film Festival on April 20, 2012.

Plot
The film follows two New York film editors, Nick and Darryl, trying to balance their love lives while reworking a film and maintaining their friendship despite their work differences. Nick, who is engaged to Amy, considers having an affair with Jamie, the star of the film he and Darryl are editing, while Darryl has troubles with his bossy and demanding girlfriend Liana.

Cast
 Alex Karpovsky as Nick
 Tarik Lowe as Darryl
 Arielle Kebbel as Jamie
 Sophia Takal as Amy
 Melonie Diaz as Liana
 Mike Landry as Mike
 Kevin Corrigan as Adrian
 Lena Dunham as Alexa
 Sebastian Sozzi as Sebastian

Production
Dan Schechter: "When I started, I just wanted to make a film, a really good film, for under $50,000, and that was the main goal (and we ended up incredibly close to that number). The editing thing was an arbitrary choice at first. This film was about two best buds and their respective relationships, and we just needed to give them some career to do together so they could bitch at work to one another. So I chose editing because I had some good experiences I could draw from, and perhaps we could get away with not being a "film about making films” because, really, that storyline is about specifically being an editor and what that day job is like."

Schechter and Lowe based the semi-autobiographical film on incidents from their personal lives, crafting a simultaneously offbeat and naturalistic New York story. Schechter's own experience as an editor is evident in the script, which blends intimate relationships with humorous details of life in an editing room. Schechter had a number of his indie movie associates perform in this movie, such as Melonie Diaz. Lena Dunham and Alex Karpovsky, both of Girls fame also starred. The film was shot in 12 days.

Reception
The film opened to positive reviews. Rotten Tomatoes gives a score of 86% based on seven reviews. On Metacritic, the film has a score of 62 out of 100 based on 7 critics, indicating "generally favorable reviews".

Jason Bailey of DVD Talk had the following evaluation to make: Lowe and director Daniel Schechter's script is fast and witty—the Nick/Darryl duets (which make up a good chunk of the picture) have a sharp, conversational style and tempo, as well as the sense of a long-time friendship, articulated by ball-busting and one-upsmanship—and it got an insider's knowledge of the business, what with the metaphorical act of partitioning drives and labeling bins, or the escalating flirtations at an ADR session. (Between this and the hot foley recording scene in Nobody Walks, it's a big year for sexy sound nerds.)"

Vanessa Martinez, a critic with Indie Wire discusses the powerful rapport of the main characters of the film: "you will enjoy witnessing this duo’s connection, and even co-dependence to a degree, as they find a way to remain loyal to each other through life's highs and lows aside from their very different personalities, thanks to naturalistic and engaging performances. Also, the twists and turns of the film’s plot prevent the film from becoming predictable and ordinary, much like life itself."

Brandon Harris a reporter with Filmmaker (magazine) said:"
Daniel Schechter’s Supporting Characters surprised me. I was prepared to hate it. Excited to, even. It charmed the pants right off me. It might as well be TV, the way it’s shot (of course that means a lot less than it did ten years ago since TV is art now), and it couldn’t be more built to play Tribeca, but it’s genuinely written with feeling, humor and friendship that feels true and complicated."

"Supporting Characters -- Part bromance, part ode to '70s comedies like Modern Romance, director Daniel Schechter has a witty sense of humor that's delivered perfectly by leads Alex Karpovsky and Tarik Lowe. Its honest and smart look at relationships and friendship inside the bubble of NYC would work as a perfect double-feature with Lena Dunham's Tiny Furniture (who also makes a cameo in Characters)."—Jason Guerrasio
of Fandango.

Soundtrack
 
Drawing on his friends in the indie movie business, the soundtrack is by Schechter's friend indie director and musician Jordan Galland. In exchange for doing the soundtrack for the movie, Schecter edited the trailer for Alter Egos, Jordan Galland’s movie.

References

External links
 

2012 films
American independent films
Films about film directors and producers
Films about filmmaking
2010s English-language films
2010s American films